Topsa is a rural locality (a village) in Rochegodskoye Rural Settlement of Vinogradovsky District, Arkhangelsk Oblast, Russia. The population was 288 as of 2010.

Geography 
Topsa is located 61 km southeast of Bereznik (the district's administrative centre) by road. Klykovskaya is the nearest rural locality.

References 

Rural localities in Vinogradovsky District
Shenkursky Uyezd